D'Kings Men is a compilation album by Nigerian record label DB Records. It was released on June 24, 2013, by the label and Sony. The album was produced by Don Jazzy, Jay Sleek and Dee Vee. It features guest appearances from Kanye West, Big Sean, Snoop Lion, Fally Ipupa, Durella, Olamide, Ikechukwu and Naeto C. D'Kings Men produced eleven singles—"Oliver Twist", "Sister Caro", "Oyato", "Bachelor", "Top of the World", "Cashflow", "Don't Tell Me Nonsense", "For Example", "Finally", "Why You Love Me" and "Obimo (My Heart)". It received mixed reviews from music critics, who panned its lyrics and sound.

Background and release
D'banj founded the DB Records label and started working on the album prior to splitting with his longtime business partner Don Jazzy. Since the label's inception, multiple acts have signed to the label, including Kayswitch, J.Sol, Jay Sleek, Durella and Dee Vee. In an interview with Seun Apara, D'banj gave an exclusive insight into the album. He said the record "has a compilation of songs and sounds done by DB records artistes comprising myself, Kay Switch and J.Sol." D'banj also said Don Jazzy produced four songs on the album. In an attempt to suppress piracy, the album was delivered to customers who pre-ordered it from D'banj's official website. It was also made available for purchase at all GT Bank offices in Nigeria.

D'Kings Men was made available for purchase on iTunes a day after the DKM concert. Headlined by D'banj and 2 Chainz, the concert was held at the Eko Hotels and Suites on June 23, 2013. It featured additional performances from Kay Switch, Phyno, Olamide, Mafikizolo, Fally Ipupa, and Naeto C. Guest in attendance included Ayo Makun, Kenya Moore, and Toolz, among others.

Singles
The album's lead single "Oliver Twist" was released on May 11, 2012. The music video for the song was directed by Sesan Ogunro and features cameo appearances from Kanye West, Pusha T, Big Sean, and Manny Fresh. The D'banj-assisted track "Sister Caro" was released on June 9, 2012, as the album's second single. The music video was shot in Lagos, Nigeria. The album's third single "Oyato" was released on July 14, 2012. It serves as D'banj's first official single in the post-Mo'Hits era. "Bachelor" was released on November 10, 2012, as the album's fourth single. The accompanying music video was also directed by Sesan in Atlanta, Georgia.

The album's fifth single "Top of the World" was released on December 13, 2012. It was the official SuperSport anthem for the 2013 African Nations Cup. The music video for "Top of the World" was shot in South Africa. In the video, D’banj can be seen singing into a forest of mics while performing alongside a dreadlocked guitarist and rock drummer. On December 21, 2012, the Kayswitch-assisted track "Cashflow" was released as the album's sixth single. The music video for the song was also directed by Sesan. The album's seventh single "Don't Tell Me Nonsense" was released March 30, 2013. The song's accompanying music video was shot in Lagos by Matt Max and features helicopters, smoke bombs, and an army of dancers.

"For Example" was released on March 30, 2013, as the album's eighth single. Its music video was shot and directed by Matt Max in Mende Village, Lagos. Nigerian singer Durella made a cameo appearance in the video. The album's ninth single "Why You Love Me" was released on April 21, 2013. Its music video was directed by Godfather Productions and uploaded to YouTube on December 13, 2013. "Finally" was released on June 20, 2013, as the album's tenth single. The accompanying music video for the song was shot and directed in London by Sesan; it features cameo appearances from Wizkid and the CEO Dancers. The wedding anthem "Obimo" was released on November 20, 2013, as the album's eleventh single. Its music video was directed by Patrick Elis.

Critical reception

D'Kings Men received mixed reviews from music critics. Jon Caramanica of The New York Times described the album as "an alluring contemporary pop album with an emphasis on king-size dance music." Reviewing for Nigerian Entertainment Today, Ayomide Tayo awarded the album 3.5 stars out of 5, acknowledging its inclusion of "strong pop songs hinged on D'banj's infectious personality and amazing instrumentals." Ogaga Sakapide of TooXclusive gave the album 3 stars out of 5, saying it "dives into the usual subjects of partying, love, wealth, fame and success". A writer for Tayo TV granted the album 6.7 stars out of 10, calling it "average" at best.

Track listing

Personnel

Dapo Daniel Oyebanjo – primary artist
Kehinde Oladotun Oyebanjo – primary artist
Jason Lopez – primary artist
Olamide Adedeji – featured artist
luwadamilare Kulaja – featured artist
Kanye Omari West – featured artist
Sean Michael Anderson – featured artist
Calvin Cordozar Broadus, Jr – featured artist
Faustin Ipupa N'Simba – featured artist
Ikechuckwu – featured artist
Michael Collins Ajereh – producer
Jay Sleek – producer
Dee Vee – producer
Classy Menace – producer

Release history

References

2013 compilation albums
D'banj albums
Albums produced by Don Jazzy
Yoruba-language albums
Albums produced by Jay Sleek